The 1999 World Orienteering Championships, the 18th World Orienteering Championships, were held in Inverness, Scotland, 1–8 August 1999.

The championships had six events; the classic distance (formerly called individual) for men and women, the short distance for men and women, and relays for men and women.

Medalists

References 

World Orienteering Championships
1999 in Scottish sport
International sports competitions hosted by Scotland
August 1999 sports events in Europe
Orienteering in Scotland
Sport in Inverness
20th century in Inverness